Marco Antônio Barroso Nanini (born 31 May 1948) is a Brazilian actor. Most of his activities have been in comedy.

Nanini achieved national sensation through his participation in the theatre piece "O Mistério de Irma Vap", together with fellow actor and friend Ney Latorraca. It was one of the biggest box office successes in Brazil, staying for 11 consecutive years with the same casting (a Guinness World Record). It was also filmed under the direction of Carla Camurati, premiering in 2006.

Personal life
In 2011, Nanini spoke at the first time about his sexuality to a Brazilian magazine, addressing questions on the subject: "Oh, it's going well, sometimes a young man appears, sometimes not, but I'm okay." declared the actor, who lives with producer, Fernando Libonati in Rio de Janeiro, Brazil.

Filmography

Film
 2006 - Irma Vap - o retorno
 2003 - Brother Bear (voz)
 2003 - Lisbela e o Prisioneiro
 2003 - Apolônio Brasil - O Campeão da Alegria
 2001 - Caramuru - A Invenção do Brasil (narração)
 2001 - Copacabana
 2001 - O Xangô de Baker Street
 2000 - O Auto da Compadecida
 1998 - Amor & Cia.
 1995 - Carlota Joaquina – Princesa do Brasil
 1987 - Anjos da Noite
 1987 - Feliz Ano Velho
 1980 - Teu Tua
 1978 - A Noite dos Duros
 1975 - O Roubo das Calcinhas
 1973 - Moças daquela Hora

Television
A Grande Família - Lineu Silva
A Invenção do Brasil - presenter
Andando nas Nuvens - Otávio Montana
Dona Flor e Seus Dois Maridos - Teodoro
Pedra Sobre Pedra - Ivonaldo
TV Pirata
Brega e Chique - Montenegro
Um Sonho a Mais - Mosca/Florisbela
Feijão Maravilha - Jorginho
O Feijão e o Sonho - barber Oficial
Sítio do Picapau Amarelo - Guarda Anselmo
Gabriela - Professor Josué
Carinhoso - Faísca
O Cafona - Julinho

Theater
O Mistério de Irma Vap

Awards
 Indication for best actor to the Grande Prêmio Cinema Brasil, for his acting in Amor & Cia.
 Best Actor Award at the Festival de Cinema Brasileiro de Miami.

References

1948 births
Living people
20th-century Brazilian male actors
21st-century Brazilian male actors
Male actors from Recife
Brazilian people of Italian descent
Brazilian male television actors
Brazilian gay actors